= Bob Wyss =

American journalist and author

Bob Wyss is an American journalist and author. He is Professor Emeritus of journalism at the University of Connecticut.

== Selected works ==
- Black Gold: The Rise, Reign, and Fall of American Coal (2025)
- The Man Who Built the Sierra Club: A Life of David Brower (Columbia University Press, 2016)
- Brimfield Rush, The Thrill of Collecting and the Hunt for the Big Score (2006)
